Kara Special Premium Box for Japan is the first box set by South Korean pop girl group Kara. It was released on April 28, 2010 in Japan and contain all albums from 2007 to 2009.

Album listing 
 CD1 : The First Blooming
 CD2 : Rock U
 CD3 : Pretty Girl
 CD4 : Honey
 CD5 : Revolution
 CD6 :
 "Pretty Girl" (JPN Ver.)
 "Honey" (JPN Ver.)
 "Wanna" (JPN Ver.)
 DVD : KARA in Okinawa

Chart performance

Oricon Chart

Sources 

Kara (South Korean group) albums
Dance-pop compilation albums
2010 compilation albums
Universal Records compilation albums